Cepheus (Ancient Greek: Κηφεύς Kepheús) may refer to:

In Greek mythology
 Cepheus (father of Andromeda), and King of Aethiopia
 Cepheus (king of Tegea), the king of Tegea, Arcadia

In astronomy
 Cepheus (constellation), one of the 88 modern constellations
 Cepheus (crater), a lunar impact crater

In Computing
 Cepheus (poker bot)

In modern fiction
 Cepheus Daidalos, a fictional character in the manga and anime, Saint Seiya
 Cepheus, the FM king in Mega Man Star Force
 In the Galaxy Railways, one of the squads is named the Cepheus Platoon.

Other uses
 USS Cepheus (AKA-18), an Andromeda class attack cargo ship